The World's Best 10K (WB10K) is a road race of 10 kilometers celebrated in San Juan, Puerto Rico every year. It is certified by the Association of International Marathons and Road Races (AIMS) and by the International Amateur Athletic Federation (IAAF). 

WB10K was ranked among the 20 most competitive races in the world. In 2003, Paula Radcliffe of England completed the course in a world record time of 30 minutes 21 seconds. The men's race at the 2010 edition, won by Rigoberto Gaetán, had six runners break the 28 minute mark. Lornah Kiplagat has been the race's most successful competitor as she has won the women's race on six occasions.

The race was first held in 1998, when it was known as the Puente Teodoro Moscoso 10 km. The competition changed to its current title in 2000.

Prizes

 World best record: $100,000 USD
 First place: US$25,000 with a US$10,000 bonus for men under 28 minutes and women under 31 minutes.

Past winners
Key:

See also
Sports in Puerto Rico

References

External links
 Official website

10K runs
Athletics in Puerto Rico
Recurring sporting events established in 1998
Annual sporting events
1998 establishments in Puerto Rico
Sports in San Juan, Puerto Rico